django CMS is a free and open source content management system platform for publishing content on the World Wide Web and intranets. It is written in Django language framework, with Python.

History
django CMS 1.0 was created by Thomas Steinacher.

django CMS 2.0 was a complete rewrite of the system by Patrick Lauber, itself based on a fork of django-page-cms.

django CMS 3.0 was released in 2013.

, django CMS 3.0 is compatible with Django versions 1.8 and 1.7.

, django CMS 3.4 introduced a Long Term Support (LTS) release cycle.

, django CMS 3.5 introduced structure board decoupled from page rendering and offer Page copy between sites, compatible with Django 1.8 to 1.11

As of 29 January 2019, django CMS 3.6 introduced Django 2.0 and 2.1 support

As of 25 September 2019, django CMS 3.7 introduced Django 2.2 support

As of 22 April 2020, Django CMS 3.7 introduced Django 3.0 support

As of 30 June 2021, django CMS 3.9 introduced Django 3.2 support

In July 2020 Divio, which had originally developed django CMS and had maintained it up to that point, handed over responsibility for the open-source project to the newly founded django CMS Association (dCA). Divio remains committed to django CMS as a sponsor of the django CMS website and as one of the founding members of the dCA, along with what. and Eliga Services.

Translations
django CMS handles multilingual content by default. Its administration interface supports several languages.

Transifex is used to manage the translations of the project. The current status of the translations can be found here.

Features
Frontend-editing  edit all plugins within the page.
Reusable plugins  use django CMS plugins in your own apps.
Flexible Plugin Architecture  build flexible pages with a wide range of plugins.
Search Engine Optimization  the structure of the pages is optimized for indexing.
Editorial workflow  workflows for publishing and approval.
Permission Management  set specific rights to different users.
Versioning  each modification of the page will be saved. You can restore any state you wish.
Multisites  administer multiple websites over the same admin interface.
Multilanguage  support for different languages (i.e. Arabic, Chinese or Russian)
Applications (Apps)  add apps to different pages of the CMS.
Media Asset Manager (MAM)  allows you to manage all kind of assets (pictures, PDFs, videos and other documents).

See also
 Content management system
 List of content management systems

Notes

External links

Blog software
Content management systems
Free content management systems
Website management
Free software programmed in Python
Software using the BSD license